Bountiful Blessings (simplified Chinese: 万福楼) is a 20-episode fantasy drama serial telecast by MediaCorp Channel 8. It stars Jessica Hsuan , 
Tay Ping Hui, Thomas Ong , Ann Kok , Yao Wenlong , Jeffrey Xu , Ya Hui & Zhu Houren as the casts of the series. It made its debut on 30 August 2011 and has ended on 26 September 2011. It is screened every weekday night at 9.00pm.

It will make its encore from 21 March 2012 to 17 April 2012, at 5.30pm.

Cast

Trivia
This marks Ann Kok's return after The Family Court, playing villain for the consecutive second time. In that drama, her being villain was under the influence of another part-time antagonist. This time, her being villain was being a natural hatredism.
This also marks Thomas Ong who returns after The Illusionist and Secrets for Sale.
我是你的天空 by Ocean Ou is Taste of Love's theme song, reused as Fuyuan also sung this song.

5.30pm encore
This drama would be encored at 5.30pm despite a few episodes having violence, similar to The Family Court and The Score. It was planned for an Unriddle 2 quick encore, which has similar violent scenes, the next weekday after the finale, but however Be Happy would be encored instead.

2012 Accolades
This series garnered two nominations in the performance category for Star Awards 2012. Results would be announced on 29 April 2012 at Resorts World Sentosa during which the award ceremony will be televised 'LIVE' on MediaCorp TV Channel 8.

Show 1

Show 2

See also
List of Bountiful Blessings episodes

Singaporean television series
Fantasy television series
Chinese-language television shows
2011 Singaporean television series debuts
2011 Singaporean television series endings
Channel 8 (Singapore) original programming